Bhai Sahib Bhai Randhir Singh ji (1878–1961) was a Sikh leader who started the Gurdwara Sudhaar Movement, and founded the Akhand Kirtani Jatha.

Life
Bhai Sahib Bhai Randhir Singh ji was born as Basant Singh in Narangwal, Ludhiana district, Punjab on July 7, 1878 in a Sikh Jat family. His father Natha Singh worked as a District Inspector of Schools and as a Judge in the High Court of the State of Nabha. He completed his schooling in Nabha and higher education from Government and Foreman Christian Colleges at Lahore. Singh wrote various books on Sikh theology, philosophy, and the Sikh way of life. He was charged in 1914 with waging war against the British Crown and had to undergo life-imprisonment from 1914 to 1931. He died on Vaisakhi, April 13, 1961 and his cremation took place at the lake between Gujjrawal and Narangwal.

Publications
 Gurmat Lekh (1937)
 Gurmat Nam Abhiyas Kamai (1938)
 Jail Chithian (1938)
 Charan Kamal Ki Mauj (1939)
 Kee Sri Guru Granth Sahib Di Puja But Prasti Hai? (1940)
 Anhad Shabad Dasam Duaar (1942)
 Amrit Kallaa
 Gurmat Bibek (1949)
 An-dithi Duniya (1949)
 Karam Philosophy (1951)
 Baba Vayd Rogiaa Da (1952)
 Gurmat Rammjaa (1952)
 Haumai Naavay Naal Virodh Hai 
 Temar Aageya Thu Oajara Aerthat Gyan Chanha
 Darshan Jhalkaan
 Granth Prem Sumarg (1953)
 Gurbani diyan Lagaan Matraan dee Vilakhantaa  (1954)
 Sant Padh Nirnay (1954) 
 Ik Umar Kaidi Da Supna 
 Katha Keertan (1957)
 Sikh Itihaas De Partakh Darshan  (1958)
 Jhatka Maas Prathai Tat Gurmat Nirnay (1958)
 Sachkhand Darshan (1959)
 Zaharaa zahoor Guru Gobind Singh
 Amrit Ki Hai? (1960)
 Aastak Tei Naastak
 Gagan Oudaree
 Rangle Sajjan
 Jyot Vigaas
 Sikh Kaun Hai?
 Autobiography of Bhai Sahib Randhir Singh - translation by Trilochan Singh (1971)

References

Further reading

Indian Sikhs
1878 births
1961 deaths
Sikh writers